Subb was a Canadian ska punk band formed in November 1992 in Saint-Jean-sur-Richelieu, Quebec. Since their beginning in the early 1990s, the band released four full-length albums, one EP and one split CD on the labels Stomp Records and Underworld Records. Though they experienced several lineup changes over the years, founding members Mart Charron and Stef Gauthier remained in the group. The band's musical style initially blended elements of punk rock, ska, and hardcore into a genre popularly known as ska punk or "ska-core," which characterized their first two albums. In 2002 they shifted gears, moving away from this sound and producing an album with a heavy pop punk influence. After a brief hiatus in 2003, the band moved back towards their ska, punk and hardcore elements.

Band history

1992-1995: The early years
Subb formed in 1992 in Saint-Jean-sur-Richelieu, Quebec under the name Society Under Babbling Boobs (S.U.B.B.). The band's original lineup consisted of Mart Charron on vocals & guitar, Fred Gagné on lead guitar, Stef Gauthier on bass, and Chris Roy on drums. This lineup lasted two years until Fred and Chris left the group in 1994. Jeepy Paiement joined the band in December 1994 as the new drummer. The trio spent the next 3 months writing songs before recording their first demo tape during the summer. That's when the band decided to drop the acronyme and just called themselves Subb.

1996-1999: Underworld Records years
In 1995, Subb met singer Jeff Quesnel and he would be a turning point in the band's future sound. Later that year, Jonh Génier replaced Jeepy on drums, but he was himself soon replaced by Nick Poissant and Subb signed to Underworld Records, a Montreal-based record label. 1996 saw the arrival of a second guitarist, Math Goyette and the release of their first CD, Two ban' an' a split, a split album with friends Thirdfall. Nick left the band in September 1997 and was replaced by JF Lague. In December, their first full-length release "The Highstep to Hell" came and received critical acclaim from fans and critics alike. The song "Mister Gun" was soon to become a fan favorite, and the band supported their release by touring across Canada. In November 1998 the band released a 100% auto-produced EP entitled Like Kids in a Field and kept on touring to support their DIY release during the next year.

2000-2002: Stomp Records years (Part one)
In September 1999, Subb signed to Stomp Records and in March 2000, Subb released "Until the party ends". This record was a new chapter in the band's young career with its mix of raw energy of punk rock with sweet stylings of ska and reggae music. They have toured extensively in 2000 to support "Until the party ends". After taking part in the national Vans "State of the Union" Tour with label-mates Reset and Men O' Steel, the band went on to play the Montreal and Toronto stops of the Vans Warped Tour. Also, they have toured a lot in Quebec, Ontario and the Canadian east coast with bands such as Less Than Jake, Suicide Machines, Strung Out, No Motiv, Samiam and The Planet Smashers. The videos for the singles "L.A. Beach Bum" brought their sound to a wider audience as it was put into heavy rotation on MusiquePlus and has been featured on Much Music as well as being the indie spotlight.

2001 started off well for the band has they played the MusiquePlus "Jam des neiges 2001" alongside Orgy and Crazy Town in front of an audience of 10 000 people. In April, Subb crossed the pond and toured Europe for 3 weeks, playing gigs all across Switzerland and Germany. As soon as they got back from Europe, they were on the road again, this time touring Canada from coast to coast with ska superstars The Planet Smashers. After the two-month tour, Subb played again at the Vans Warped tour on the local Union stage, in front of 8000 crazy fans, in Montreal and Toronto. The launch of the re-released "The Ultimate Highstep to Hell" was played in front of a sold-out crowd at Montreal's The Spectrum.

The year 2002 saw the launch of Daylight Saving, Subb's second full length original album for STOMP Records.  In terms of touring, Subb headlined the very successful Molson Dry/Musique Plus 123 Punk Tour in April and May. In the summer, the band played the Ramprage event with Pennywise and played 3 dates (Boston, Montreal, Toronto) on the Vans Warped Tour on the Union Stage. Subb put out 3 videos from this record, Daylight Saving, the title track, "Twenty-One" and "Out of the line". "Twenty-One" received airplay on Musique Plus, Much Music and Much Loud. "Out of the Line" was also added into rotation on MuchLoud. At the end of this year they did a regional Quebec and Ontario tour with Big Wig and Jettison.

2003-2010: Stomp records years (Part two)

After a short hiatus in early 2003, the band started working on new songs and kept on doing so for the next 2 years. In April 2006, the band's album The Motions came out. Their fourth full-length album was recorded at Piccolo studios in Montreal (The Sainte Catherines, Voivod, Simple Plan, etc.) and produced by Frank Joly.

Subb also toured extensively in 2006. The band took part of the national 2006 GRIND tour in May, with Mad Caddies, Satanic Surfers, The Loved Ones and label-mates The Resistance. In the summer, they played several dates in Quebec and Ontario to support the new album  and played the Toronto and Montreal stops of the Vans Warped Tour.

In 2007, they were invited by the Vulgaires Machins for a series of shows. With Akuma also on the bill, the tour was spread throughout February, March and April. In April, The Motions was released in Japan, on One Big Family Records, and the band was invited to Japan for a tour.

The album To This Beat was released on May 2, 2009 on Stomp Records. They enlisted the help of Jah Cutta to dive even deeper into the roots of ska music with tributes to their home town ("I Heart Montreal"), reggae music and culture ("Shottas & Mount Zion").

In December 2009, the band was officially on hiatus.  They subsequently announced that they were disbanding at the beginning of Spring 2010.  One last tour was announced, and a record with demos, rarities and dubs was coming up in September 2010.  The "Zero To Zero Tour '10" took place from September 2010 to November 2010.  Subb gave their last performance on November 20, in their hometown of Saint-Jean-sur-Richelieu.

Life after Subb : Projects; 2010-present

Jeff Quesnel is working on his solo career, oriented towards reggae and dub music.  He also played in Don't Push, a Sublime tribute band with JF Lague on drums, and he was a guest singer for The Stomp All Stars, a Montreal cover band that is paying tribute to the best of ska and reggae music around the world.  On June 19, 2012, his solo debut album "Yes Me Lion!" was released as a digital project.  The 12 track album features guest artist Jah Cutta and hip hop mc Dannu of the collective Visionaries.  Math Goyette played additional guitars on the record and Stephan Gauthier did the artwork.  "Yes Me Lion!" is available at http://jeffquesnel.bandcamp.com/

Martin Charron and Stephan Gauthier are in a band called "Low Dead Volume".  Their first demo The Mantis was released in December 2011 and is available at http://lowdeadvolume.bandcamp.com/

Band members

Discography

Albums

EPs

Demos

References
 http://www.stomprecords.com/bandsview.php?id=28 Stomp Records 
 
 http://www.billboard.com/bbcom/discography/index.jsp?pid=334783&aid=786509 Billboard.com 
 http://ca.music.yahoo.com/ar-299071---Subb Yahoo.com 
 http://music.aol.com/artist/subb/1334982 AOL music

External links
 
 Subb Stomp records official profile

Canadian punk rock groups
People from Saint-Jean-sur-Richelieu
Ska punk musical groups
Canadian ska groups